Jian Yang is a Chinese statistical geneticist and Professor of Statistical Genomics at the University of Queensland's Institute for Molecular Bioscience, as well as an affiliated professor at the Queensland Brain Institute. He received the 2015 Ruth Stephens Gani Medal for his research on the "missing heritability" of complex traits. In 2017, he received the Frank Fenner Prize for Life Scientist of the Year from the Prime Minister of Australia for his work on the basis of genetic variation in complex human traits, such as obesity and schizophrenia. He has researched the contribution of numerous single nucleotide polymorphisms to variation in quantitative traits, such as human height, as well as the role of natural selection in driving genetic variation in such traits. He and his colleagues have also used genetic data on common diseases to study potential environmental risk factors for them.

References

External links
Faculty page 

1981 births
Living people
Chinese geneticists
Chinese statisticians
Statistical geneticists
Chinese expatriates in Australia
Academic staff of the University of Queensland
Zhejiang University alumni
Scientists from Wenzhou
21st-century Chinese scientists